Phila  may refer to a shortened name for the City of Philadelphia, U.S.

It may also refer to:
Phila of Elimeia, sister of Derdas and wife of Philip II of Macedon
Phila (daughter of Antipater), wife of Balacrus, Craterus and Demetrius Poliorcetes
Phila (daughter of Seleucus), wife of Antigonus Gonatas
Phila (daughter of Demetrius)
Phila (daughter of Theodorus), daughter of Theodorus of Athamania
Phila of Thebes, courtesan 
Phila (Pieria), ancient town in Pieria, Macedonia kingdom
philA is a nickname used by Phil Agcaoili

See also
Fila (disambiguation)